Scheibenhardt is a German municipality located in the state of Rhineland-Palatinate. In 2004 it had 714 inhabitants. Situated on the border with Alsace, it is continuous with the French village of Scheibenhard, separated only by a small creek called the Lauter.

References

Divided cities
Germersheim (district)